Elachista aepsera is a moth of the family Elachistidae. It is found in Australia, where it has been recorded from Queensland.

The wingspan is 5.6–6 mm for males and about 6 mm for females. The ground colour of the forewings is grey basally, with dark grey-tipped scales. The hindwings are grey.

References

Moths described in 2011
aepsera
Moths of Australia